Mount Metcalfe is a mountain at the south side of the head of McMorrin Glacier,  south of Mount Wilcox, in Graham Land, Antarctica. It was named by the UK Antarctic Place-Names Committee for Robert J. Metcalfe, a British Antarctic Survey surveyor at Stonington Island, 1960–62, who surveyed the area in 1962.

References

Mountains of Graham Land
Fallières Coast